Jack Southern (2 May 1874 – 7 March 1919) was an Australian rules footballer who played for the South Melbourne Football Club in the Victorian Football League (VFL).

References

External links 

1874 births
1919 deaths
New Zealand players of Australian rules football
Australian rules footballers from Victoria (Australia)
Sydney Swans players
New Zealand emigrants to Australia